Bernd Karwofsky (17 March 1945 - 31 January 2023) was a German ski jumper. He competed in the normal hill event at the 1968 Winter Olympics.

References

External links

 

1945 births
2023 deaths
German male ski jumpers
Olympic ski jumpers of East Germany
People from Klingenthal
Ski jumpers at the 1968 Winter Olympics
Sportspeople from Saxony
20th-century German people